Charlotte Inez Pomerantz (July 24, 1930July 24, 2022) was an American children's writer and journalist.

Early life and education
Charlotte Inez Pomerantz was born on July 24, 1930, in Brooklyn, New York, to Phyllis (Cohen) and Abraham Pomerantz. She received a bachelor's degree from Sarah Lawrence College in 1953.

Personal life
Pomerantz married Carl Marzani on November 12, 1966. She died in Charlottesville, Virginia, on July 24, 2022, her 92nd birthday.

Work
Her 1975 story The Princess and the Admiral won a Jane Addams Children's Book Award. Pomerantz's story The Piggy in the Puddle appeared on Reading Rainbow in 1992.

Books published by Marzani & Munsell
 A quarter-century of un-Americana: a tragico-comical memorabilia of HUAC (1963)
 The mood of the nation (November 22–29, 1963)

Pamphlet published by the Labor Committee for Peace in Vietnam
The Unspeakable War: Dead End of a Colonial War 1940–1966 (1966)

Books for children
All Asleep (1984)
One Duck, Another Duck (1984)
How Many Trucks Can A Tow Truck Tow? (1987)
The Mousery (2000)

References

1930 births
2022 deaths
20th-century American women writers
American children's writers
Sarah Lawrence College alumni
Writers from Brooklyn